This is the list of number-one tracks on the ARIA Club Chart in 2013, and is compiled by the Australian Recording Industry Association (ARIA) from weekly DJ reports.

2013

Number-one artists

See also
ARIA Charts
List of number-one singles of 2013 (Australia)
List of number-one albums of 2013 (Australia)
2013 in music

References

Number-one singles
Australia Club Chart
2013 Club